Tommy Aquino (May 24, 1992 – February 2, 2014) was an American motorcycle racer who competed in the AMA Pro Daytona Sportbike Championship. His best result in the class was in 2011 when he finished third in the championship, with one win.

He later rode in the British Superstock Championship becoming known as Hollywood Aquino with a contract to ride for Brent Gladwin's GR Motorsport team in British Superbikes for 2014.

He died following a training accident while riding motocross in what was described as a head-on accident with another rider who was out of control.

References 

1992 births
2014 deaths
American motorcycle racers
People from Woodland Hills, Los Angeles
Sports deaths in California
Motorcycle racers from Los Angeles